Timiryazevsky is a rural locality (a settlement) in Mikhaylovskoye Rural Settlement, Paninsky District, Voronezh Oblast, Russia. The population was 207 as of 2010. There are 4 streets.

Geography 
Timiryazevsky is located 6 km southeast of Panino (the district's administrative centre) by road. Toyda is the nearest rural locality.

References 

Rural localities in Paninsky District